Chelsea Football Club Women, formerly known as Chelsea Ladies Football Club, are an English women's football club based in Norbiton that competes in the Women's Super League, the top flight of women's football in England. Since 2004, the club has been affiliated with Chelsea F.C., a men's team in the Premier League. Chelsea Women were a founding member of the Super League in 2010. From 2005 to 2010, the side competed in the Premier League National Division, the top tier of women's football in England at the time.

The club has won a record five Women's Super League championships, as well as the FA WSL Spring Series in 2017, and has the second-highest number of outright league championships after Arsenal. They have also won four Women's FA Cup titles, two FA Women's League Cup titles, and were Women's FA Community Shield winners in 2020. They reached their first UEFA Women's Champions League final in 2021, where they were defeated by Barcelona Femení.

History

Establishment
Chelsea Ladies Football Club was formed in 1992 after supporters of Chelsea F.C. expressed desire for a women's side. In June 2004, Chelsea Ladies voted to be taken over and funded by Chelsea's Football in the Community department. The club then won promotion as champions from the Southern Division in 2004–05 to the Premier League National Division and have participated at the top level ever since.

FA Premier League National Division, 2005–2010
After starting 2005–06 with one point from six games, manager George Michealas was fired in September after four years in charge. They finished bottom of the league that season under Shaun Gore, but won a promotion/relegation play-off against Northern Division runners-up Liverpool 4–1 on aggregate to stay in the Premier League National Division. During the season the club had been linked with a transfer bid for North American star players Tiffeny Milbrett and Christine Sinclair.

After an eighth-place finish in 2006–07, Gore drafted in England players Siobhan Chamberlain, Casey Stoney and Eniola Aluko that summer. American World Cup winner Lorrie Fair, regarded as one of the best midfielders in the women's game, joined in January as Chelsea finished 2007–08 in fifth position.

Chelsea Ladies introduced a new manager for the 2008–09 season, former Arsenal Ladies reserve team coach Steve Jones. On 2 July 2008 Chelsea surprisingly signed Lianne Sanderson and Anita Asante from Arsenal Ladies, in addition to veteran Mary Phillip. Then Arsenal Ladies manager Vic Akers criticised his former players as disrespectful, while pursuing players from other clubs to bolster his own squad.

Chelsea Ladies finished the 2008–09 season third behind Arsenal and Everton. Mary Phillip retired a month into the new season, Aluko and Asante left for the new WPS in March 2009, while Fair missed the whole campaign with a cruciate ligament injury sustained in May 2008. Jones departed as manager in January 2009, leaving Stoney to act as player/manager.

At Stoney's recommendation, Matt Beard became manager for 2009–10. Cuts to the Ladies club's funding were offset by financial assistance from John Terry and other Chelsea F.C. players. A further blow arrived when Sanderson left for the 2010 WPS season.

Women's Super League (WSL), 2011–present
The club bid successfully to be one of eight founding teams in the FA Women's Super League in March 2011. On 13 April 2011, the first-ever WSL fixture was played — at Imperial Fields, Chelsea's home ground — between them and Arsenal, which they lost 1–0. Beard led the club to the Women's FA Cup final for the first time in 2012, but Chelsea were eventually beaten by Birmingham City on a penalty shootout after twice taking the lead in a 2–2 draw. In July 2012, Matt Beard resigned as manager after three years in the post.

Former assistant at Arsenal, Emma Hayes, was brought in as manager in 2012, who was one of the first female managers in the WSL. In Hayes' first season in charge, Chelsea, who were still a part-time professional club, finished third-bottom of the League. The following season, they finished second from the bottom. The club subsequently went full-time.

The 2014 season was successful for Chelsea, as they finished second in the FA Women's Super League behind Liverpool on goal difference, after eight wins, two draws and four losses. A final day win would have clinched them the league title, but they lost 2–1 away to Manchester City. Their second-place finish meant that they qualified for the UEFA Women's Champions League for the first time in the club's history. They also reached the semi-finals of both the FA Cup and the League Cup, where they lost to both eventual winners, Arsenal and Manchester City, respectively.

In 2015, it was announced that many of Chelsea's players would be becoming full professionals for the first time.

On 1 August 2015, Chelsea won their first ever Women's FA Cup. They beat Notts County Ladies at Wembley Stadium. Ji So-yun scored the only goal of the game and Eniola Aluko won the player of the match award. The team then beat Sunderland 4–0 in October 2015 to secure the FA WSL title and a League and Cup double. Chelsea repeated that feat in the 2017–18 season, winning another FA WSL and Women's FA Cup double; in the same season, the team also reached the semi-finals of the UEFA Women's Champions League for the first time. On 23 May 2018, the club rebranded as Chelsea Football Club Women.

Chelsea were awarded the 2019–20 WSL title on a points-per-game basis after the season had to be abruptly terminated due to the COVID-19 pandemic.

Chelsea began the 2020–21 season by winning their first ever FA Community Shield, against Manchester City. The season also saw them win their second consecutive League Cup, winning 6–0 against Bristol City. Chelsea and manager Hayes won their fourth WSL title, the most by any WSL team, by two points on the final day of the 2020–21 FA WSL season with a 5–0 victory over Reading. Chelsea broke the records for most wins (18) and most points (57) in a season, and became just the third team to defend the League title after Liverpool and Arsenal. Sam Kerr won the WSL Golden Boot for most goals scored by an individual (21), while Fran Kirby was joint top for assists (11) and goalkeeper Ann-Katrin Berger registered the most clean sheets (12), winning the Golden Glove. Given their remarkable performances over the season, Suzzane Wrack of The Guardian stated that Chelsea was "one of the best women's teams to ever play in England's top flight". On 16 May 2021, Chelsea, on course for a quadruple, lost 4–0 to Barcelona in their first-ever Champions League final appearance. On 5 December 2021, Chelsea won the delayed 2020–21 FA Cup, beating the league leaders Arsenal 3–0 in a dominant display, with goals from Kirby and two from Kerr, helping clinch the trophy and their first domestic treble.

Stadium
Chelsea Women play at Kingsmeadow in Norbiton, Kingston upon Thames, London. Chelsea F.C. purchased Kingsmeadow for the Women from its former occupant AFC Wimbledon, so that Wimbledon could finance their new ground, Plough Lane. Kingsmeadow has a capacity of 4,850.

Between 2012 and 2017, the team played their home games at Wheatsheaf Park. The stadium is located in Staines-upon-Thames, Middlesex and features capacity for 3,002 spectators.

The team previously played at Imperial Fields during the 2011–12 season, the home ground of Tooting & Mitcham United.

Attendance 
The current home attendance record of a Chelsea Women's match is 38,350, set on 20 November 2022 during the 2022–23 Women's Super League season match against Tottenham Hotspur, played at Stamford Bridge. Their current home attendance record at their primary ground of Kingsmeadow is 4,670, set on 28 April 2019 in a Champion's League semi-final leg against Lyon.

Players

Current squad

Out on loan

Development Squad and Academy

Former players
For details of former players, see :Category:Chelsea F.C. Women players.

Player of the Year

Management team

Honours 

Chelsea's first major trophy was the Women's FA Cup, won in 2015. In the same year, the club also won its first League title. After winning the 2021–22 FA Women's Super League (FA WSL) season, Chelsea became the first team to win the WSL title for three seasons in a row. Their most recent success came in May 2022, when they won their fourth FA Cup title.

Domestic competitions

League titles 
 Women's Super League
 Winners (5): 2015, 2017–18, 2019–20, 2020–21, 2021–22
 Runners-up (2): 2014, 2016

 FA WSL Spring Series
 Winners (1): 2017

 Premier League Southern Division
 Winners (1): 2004–05

Cups 
 Women's FA Cup
 Winners (4): 2014–15, 2017–18, 2020–21, 2021–22
 Runners-up (2): 2011–12, 2015–16

 FA Women's League Cup
 Winners (2): 2019–20, 2020–21
 Runners-up (2): 2021–22, 2022–23

 Women's FA Community Shield
 Winners (1): 2020

 Surrey County Cup
 Winners (9): 2002–03, 2003–04, 2005–06, 2006–07, 2007–08, 2008–09, 2009–10, 2011–12, 2012–13
 Runners-up (2): 2004–05, 2010–11

Notes

European competitions
 UEFA Women's Champions League
 Runners-up (1): 2020–21

Other
Doubles
2014−15: League and FA Cup
2017–18: League and FA Cup
2019–20: League and League Cup
2021–22: League and FA Cup

Trebles
2020–21: League, FA Cup and League Cup

Season-by-season records

Record in UEFA Women's Champions League

All results (home, away and aggregate) list Chelsea's goal tally first.

UEFA club coefficient ranking

References

External links

 
 Chelsea Women at Soccerway

 
Women
Women's football clubs in England
Women's football clubs in London
Association football clubs established in 1992
1992 establishments in England
FA WSL 1 teams
FA Women's National League teams